The 1999 Gent–Wevelgem was the 61st edition of the Gent–Wevelgem cycle race and was held on 7 April 1999. The race started in Ghent and finished in Wevelgem. The race was won by Tom Steels of the Mapei team.

General classification

References

Gent–Wevelgem
1999 in road cycling
1999 in Belgian sport
April 1999 sports events in Europe